Ladislav Čáni is a Slovak slalom canoeist who competed in the 1990s. He won a bronze medal in the C2 team event at the 1993 ICF Canoe Slalom World Championships in Mezzana.

References
Overview of athlete's results at canoeslalom.net 

Slovak male canoeists
Living people
Year of birth missing (living people)
Medalists at the ICF Canoe Slalom World Championships